OUM may refer to:

 Oracle Unified Method
 Ovonic Unified Memory
 Open University of Mauritius
 Open University Malaysia
 Oxford University Museum of Natural History

See also
 Oum (disambiguation)